Jagannathan Shivashanmugam (24 February 1901 – 17 February 1975) was an Indian politician of the Indian National Congress. In 1938, he became the first Scheduled Caste mayor of Madras. He also served as the first speaker of the Madras Legislative Assembly after India's independence.

Early life 

Shivashanmugam was born in the city of Madras on 24 February 1901 to Jagannathan, a steward. He had his schooling in Madras and graduated from Loyola College. He completed his master's in private from Madras University.

First Speaker in independent India 

The first elections to state assemblies were conducted in 1951. Since independence, the franchise had been enlarged to include all Indian citizens. Shivashanmugam was elected to the assembly and was successfully nominated as the first Speaker. Shivashanmugam served as the Speaker of the assembly from 1951 to 1955.

Later life 

From 1955 to 1961, Shivashanmugam served as a member of the Union Public Service Commission. In 1962, he was nominated to the Rajya Sabha, the upper house of Indian Parliament and served as member from 1962 to 1968.

Family 

Shivashanmugam married Chandra in 1937 and has three sons and one daughter.

Death 

Shivashanmugam died on 17 February 1975 at the age of 73.

Works

Notes 

1901 births
1975 deaths
Tamil Nadu politicians
Mayors of Chennai
Indian independence activists from Tamil Nadu